Sieglinde Gstöhl (born 1964) is an academic from Liechtenstein.

Biography 
She currently serves as Director of Studies of the department of EU International Relations and Diplomacy Studies at the College of Europe in Bruges, Belgium, as well as a professor of international relations. Before joining the College she was assistant professor of international relations from 1999 to 2005 at the Institute of Social Sciences at Humboldt University of Berlin.

She studied economics and social sciences at the University of St. Gallen, where she graduated in 1988. She later studied International Relations and Political Sciences at the Graduate Institute of International Studies in Geneva. She previously was a member of the Centre of International Affairs at Harvard University in Cambridge, Massachusetts.

Books
The Trade Policy of the European Union. Palgrave, 2018, .
Theorizing the European Neighbourhood Policy. Routledge, 2017, .
European Union Diplomacy: Coherence, Unity and Effectiveness. Brussels: P.I.E. Peter Lang, 2012, .
Europe's Near Abroad: Promises and Prospects of the EU's Neighbourhood Policy. Brussels: P.I.E. Peter Lang, 2008, .
Small States in International Relations.  Seattle/Reykjavik: University of Washington and University of Iceland Presses, 2006
Global Governance und die G8: Gipfelimpulse für Weltwirtschaft und Weltpolitik. Münster: LIT Verlag, 2003
Reluctant Europeans: Sweden, Norway, and Switzerland in the Process of Integration. Boulder: Lynne Rienner, 2002
Flexible Integration für Kleinstaaten? Liechtenstein und die Europäische Union. Schaan: Verlag der LAG. (Liechtenstein Politische Schriften, 33), 2001

External links 
  DNB
 Internetseite von Sieglinde Gstöhl
 Literaturliste von Sieglinde Gstöhl auf der Internetseite des Liechtenstein-Institut

References 

1964 births
Living people
Liechtenstein writers
Liechtenstein women writers
University of St. Gallen alumni
Graduate Institute of International and Development Studies alumni
21st-century women writers